Epirrita faenaria is a moth in the family Geometridae. It is found in Taiwan.

References

Moths described in 1911
faenaria
Moths of Taiwan